Dezej (also Romanized as Dezaj; also known as Dīzaj and Dīzeh) is a city and capital of Chaharduli District, in Qorveh County, Kurdistan Province, Iran. At the 2006 census, its population was 2,292, in 559 families.

The city is populated by Kurds.

References

Towns and villages in Qorveh County
Cities in Kurdistan Province

Kurdish settlements in Kurdistan Province